Böhlen is a village and a former municipality in the district Ilm-Kreis, in Thuringia, Germany. Since 1 January 2019, it is part of the town Großbreitenbach.

References

Former municipalities in Thuringia
Ilm-Kreis
Schwarzburg-Rudolstadt